Bali is a seaside village in the Mylopotamos  municipality, Rethymno regional unit, Crete, Greece. It is part of the community Melidoni. Located on the site of ancient Astale, and the harbor of Axus, in more recent times the sleepy fishing village of Bali has been transformed into a popular beach tourism destination.  Unlike the island of Bali in Indonesia, Bali in Crete is pronounced with the emphasis on the last syllable.

Climate 
Bali has a Mediterranean climate. The average high temperature during the summer period varies between 27-29°C.

References

External links 

 http://www.geonames.org/263524/balion.html

Populated places in Rethymno (regional unit)